Overton is an unincorporated community in Wayne County, in the U.S. state of Ohio. It lies slightly northwest of the county seat, Wooster, Ohio and southwest of West Salem, Ohio.

History
Overton was platted at an unknown date. A post office called Overton was established in 1892, and remained in operation until 1917.

References

Unincorporated communities in Wayne County, Ohio
Unincorporated communities in Ohio